{{DISPLAYTITLE:C10H10}}
C10H10 may refer to:

Compounds sharing the molecular formula:
 Basketene
 Bullvalene
 Cyclodecapentaene
 Dialin
 Divinylbenzene
 Diisopropenyldiacetylene
 Pentaprismane ([5]Prismane)
 Triquinacene